Shyne is the self-titled debut album by rapper Shyne. It was released by Sean "P. Diddy" Combs' Bad Boy Records on September 26, 2000. Shyne had been hyped prior to the album's release as similar in style and delivery to the deceased Notorious B.I.G. Shyne had also drawn unfavorable media attention for being convicted in June 2000 for his involvement in a nightclub shooting. Shyne was incarcerated at the time of this album's release. The album debuted and peaked at number 5 on the Billboard 200 and sold just under 160,000 copies in its first week.  It sold very well, eventually achieving Platinum status. It contained fewer guest artists than most Bad Boy releases. The singles from the album, "Bad Boyz," "Bonnie & Shyne" (which both feature Barrington Levy), and "That's Gangsta" were  moderate hits.

Critical reception 

Rolling Stone (10/12/00, p. 89) - 3 stars out of 5 - "...Like a 5-car pileup of luxury autos: a mix of beauty and destruction..."

Spin (12/00, pp. 218–9) - 6 out of 10 - "...Cops black gangster dreams straight from the pages of F.E.D.S....[its] strong producers...dress up his rhymes in frenetic electro beats, tweaked synths, and the old steel drum..."

Uncut (9/01, p. 102) - 4 stars out of 5 - "Thoughtful soulful declaimations delivered with a deep hued baritone, Shyne is the brightest new star in the Puff Daddy firmament..."

NME (11/11/00, p. 32) - 7 out of 10 - "...To uptempo and always creative commercial grooves, steeped in reggae bass sonics, an amoral and anti-social scenario of guiltless casual sex, bloody murders, drug transactions, betrayals and, especially, the code of the streets, gets played out..."

Track listing

Samples 
 "That's Gangsta"
 "Misdemeanor" by Foster Sylvers
 "It's Funky Enough" by The D.O.C.
 "Commission"
 "You Were Made For Me" by Luther Ingram
 "It's OK"
 "Magic Wand" by Whodini
 "The Life"
 "Just Memories" by Eddie Kendricks
 "Bonnie & Shyne"
 "La Vie En Rose" by Grace Jones
 "The Hit"
 "Todo Se Derrumbo Dentro De Mi" by Emmanuel
 "Bad Boyz"
 "Nightclubbin'" by Grace Jones
 "Here I Come" by Barrington Levy
 "Whatcha Gonna Do"
"Set It Off" by Strafe
"Whoa!" by Black Rob
Violins sampled from "Days of Pearly Spencer" by David McWilliams

Credits 
Sean "P. Diddy" Combs, Composer, Executive Producer
Barrington Levy, Performer
Dominick Mancuso, Assistant Engineer
Lynn Montrose, Assistant Engineer
Michael Patterson, Engineer
Harve Pierre, A&R, Associate Executive Producer
Ed Raso, Assistant Engineer
Shyne, Vocals
Dale Venderpool, Composer
Mario Winans, Composer

Charts

Weekly charts

Year-end charts

References

2000 debut albums
Albums produced by the Neptunes
Albums produced by Sean Combs
Bad Boy Records albums
Shyne albums